The Thomas Gallaudet Memorial is a sculpture by Daniel Chester French located on the campus of Gallaudet University in Washington, D.C., United States. The statue depicts Thomas Hopkins Gallaudet siting in a chair and Alice Cogswell standing at his side.

Creation and unveiling

French was asked by Edward Miner Gallaudet, the first president of Gallaudet University, to create a statue of his father, Thomas Hopkins Gallaudet, in 1882. Due to a lack of funding and French's busy schedule, French was not formally commissioned to create the Thomas Gallaudet Memorial until 1887. French's commission was not without controversy. Students at Gallaudet University objected to a hearing sculptor create the sculpture and lobbied for Albert Victor Ballin, who was deaf, to receive the commission. Additionally, Ballin came with the recommendation of American sculptor Augustus Saint-Gaudens, who was also French's artistic rival. Edward Miner Gallaudet refused to void French's contract, and French started working on the statue.

French completed a plaster model of the statue by November of that year. In 1888, French worked to enlarge his model. During the enlargement process, French reworked the chair that Gallaudet sits on as well as the position of his right arm. For his efforts, French was paid $3000.

The Thomas Gallaudet Memorial was unveiled in June 1889.

A replica of the statue is located in West Hartford, Connecticut.

References

Citations

Bibliography

External links

 

1889 establishments in Washington, D.C.
1889 sculptures
Bronze sculptures in Washington, D.C.
Gallaudet University
Monuments and memorials in Washington, D.C.
Sculptures by Daniel Chester French
Sculptures of men in Washington, D.C.
Statues in Washington, D.C.